The Communications and Electronics Branch is a personnel branch of the Canadian Armed Forces (CAF). The army component of the branch is designated the Royal Canadian Corps of Signals.

History
Major Wallace Bruce Matthews Carruthers (13 February 1863 – 21 October 1910) was the founder of the Canadian Signalling Corps, forerunner of the Royal Canadian Corps of Signals and the Communications and Electronics Branch. In the 1968 unification of the Canadian Forces, functional similar components of the Royal Canadian Navy, Canadian Army and Royal Canadian Air Force were combined into the new Communications and Electronics Branch.

During the Boer War, Carruthers noted the importance of tactical signaling in a successful campaign.  Observing the employment of heliographs, semaphore flags and lamps, he realized there was a need for a unit to provide proper training in the use of these systems.  Upon his return to Canada in 1902, he wrote a paper on signaling for the Royal Military College Club and championed an establishment of a signaling Corps.  In 1903, the formation of the Canadian Signal Corps was authorized by General Order 167.  It was the first Signal Corps in the British Commonwealth and is the forerunner of the Royal Canadian Corps of Signals.

On 3 February 1903, now Major Carruthers was appointed as one of two Inspectors of Signaling. Setting up his headquarters in Kingston, Ontario, he was responsible to the Militia Council for the supervision of instruction and practice of signaling and the inspection of signalers and their equipment.  In 1904, the first Provisional School of Signaling was established, with schools held in Kingston, Ottawa, Winnipeg, Montreal, Halifax, London, Quebec and Toronto over the next 2 years.

Training began in earnest in 1905 in summer militia instructional camps or in provisional schools set up in those eight cities.  546 Officers and men from the Rural Corps were trained in semaphore at the summer camps and 68 of those had qualified as signalers over the next few years.

A reorganization of the Corps in 1906 made Carruthers the Canadian Corps of Signal's Commanding Officer.  He received the title of Assistant Adjutant General for Signaling

In April 2013, the army component of the branch was officially designated with its historic title, the Royal Canadian Corps of Signals, but it remains a part of the C&E Branch.

Uniform
Cap badge: A silver depiction of Mercury with golden lightning bolts on either side placed on a field of blue.
Army shoulder title:
English: "RCCS" (all uniforms)
French: "" (all uniforms)
Miscellaneous:
 The signalman's trade qualification badge (worn on the lower sleeve of the Service Dress jacket) is the only such trade badge that features colours (blue and white) instead of just gold.

Customs and traditions
Colonel-in-Chief: Anne, Princess Royal

Branch flag: Horizontal bicolour, French grey (Munsell Notation 5PB5/2) over dark blue (Munsell Notation 7.5PB2/2). It is commonly believed that the colours of the flag represent "grey skies over blue waters"; however, the colours were inherited from the officer's Mess Dress uniforms of the Royal Canadian Corps of Signals (RCCS), which were in turn inherited from the 21st Lancers, the first unit of Major Carruthers, founder of the RCCS
Home station: CFB Kingston, Ontario
Motto: , "Swift, Skilled, Alert"); motto inherited from the Royal Canadian Corps of Signals
Nickname:
"Jimmies" – after "Jimmy", the nickname given to the Roman god Mercury as patron (and insignia) of Signals in Commonwealth countries; the origin of this particular sobriquet for the god is unknown; there are a number of theories as to why 'Jimmy' was adopted as a term of endearment for the emblem. The most widely accepted is that it came from a very popular Royal Signals boxer, Jimmy Emblem, who was the British Army Champion in 1924 and represented the Royal Signals Corps from 1921 to 1924.
"Sigs" – after the abbreviation of "Signals"
"Sig Pigs" – rhyming slang name; sometimes used deprecatingly by non-Signalmen, generally with pride by Signalmen
"Rubberheads" – Nickname applied only to Communicator Research personnel; considered pejorative or insulting when used by non-Communicator Research personnel; this references the large padded earphones that were often used by the trade.
Authorized march: "The Mercury March"
Branch colours: French grey and dark blue
Miscellaneous:
Signals units follow the cavalry practice of naming their units "regiment" for "battalion", "squadron" for "company", and "troop" for "platoon".
Trained privates in Signals or Communications units are styled "Signaller" or "Sig" for short.

Training

Canadian Forces School of Communications and Electronics
The Canadian Forces School of Communications and Electronics (CFSCE) in Kingston, Ontario was founded in 1937. Initially, CFSCE provided training in Communications and Electronics in Canadian Army and now in the Canadian Armed Forces. CFSCE provides basic, intermediate and advanced training to military personnel in the field of Communications and Electronics.

Occupations

Military occupations and military occupation codes (MOCs) within the  branch are listed below. Also listed are the uniform environment restrictions.

Military occupations that have previously existed in the C&E Branch are listed below.

Units

Regular Force units 
1 CMBG Headquarters and Signal Squadron
2 CMBG Headquarters and Signal Squadron
21 Electronic Warfare Regiment
3 CDSG Signal Squadron
4 CDSG Signal Squadron (formerly 2 Area Support Group Signal Squadron)
5 CDSG Signal Squadron
5 CMBG Headquarters and Signal Squadron (Fr 5e GBMC Quartier général et Escadron de transmissions)
Canadian Forces Information Operations Group
Canadian Forces Electronic Warfare Centre (CFEWC)
Canadian Forces Information Operations Group Headquarters (CFIOGHQ)
Canadian Forces Network Operations Centre (CFNOC)
Canadian Forces Signals Intelligence Operations Centre (CFSOC)
Canadian Forces Station Leitrim
Canadian Forces Joint Signal Regiment
Canadian Forces School of Communications and Electronics
Information Management
7 Communication Group
76 Communication Regiment
77 Line Regiment

Reserve Force units (up to 31 March 2012)
70 Communication Group Headquarters
700 (Borden) Communication Squadron
705 (Hamilton) Communication Squadron
709 (Toronto) Communication Regiment
763 (Ottawa) Communication Regiment
772 Electronic Warfare Squadron Kingston
71 Communication Group Headquarters
712 (Montreal) Communication Squadron
713 (Beauport) Communication Regiment
714 (Sherbrooke) Communication Squadron
72 Communication Group Headquarters
721 (Charlottetown) Communication Regiment
722 (Saint John) Communication Squadron
723 (Halifax) Communication Squadron
725 (Glace Bay) Communication Squadron
728 (St. John's) Communication Squadron
73 Communication Group Headquarters
734 (Regina) Communication Squadron
735 (Winnipeg) Communication Regiment
736 (Thunder Bay) Communication Squadron
737 (Saskatoon) Communication Squadron
745 (Edmonton) Communication Squadron
746 (Calgary) Communication Squadron
749 (Red Deer) Communication Squadron
74 Communication Group Headquarters
741 (Victoria) Communication Squadron
744 (Vancouver) Communication Regiment
748 (Nanaimo) Communication Squadron

Reserve Force units (from 1 April 2012)
Listed by Canadian Army Area and parent Brigade Group
4th Canadian Division
31 Canadian Brigade Group
31 Signal Regiment (formerly 705 (Hamilton) Communication Squadron)
32 Canadian Brigade Group
32 Signal Regiment (formerly 700 (Borden) Communication Squadron and 709 (Toronto) Communication Regiment)
33 Canadian Brigade Group
33 Signal Regiment (formerly 763 (Ottawa) Communication Regiment)
2nd Canadian Division
34 Canadian Brigade Group
34 Signal Regiment (formerly 712 (Montreal) Communication Squadron)
35 Canadian Brigade Group
35 Signal Regiment (formerly 713 (Beauport) Communication Regiment, and 714 (Sherbrooke) Communication Squadron)
5th Canadian Division
36 Canadian Brigade Group
36 Signal Regiment (formerly 721 (Charlottetown) Communication Regiment, 723 (Halifax) Communication Squadron, and 725 (Glace Bay) Communication Squadron)
37 Canadian Brigade Group
37 Signal Regiment (formerly 722 (Saint John) Communication Squadron, and 728 (St. John's) Communication Squadron)
3rd Canadian Division
38 Canadian Brigade Group
38 Signal Regiment (formerly 734 (Regina) Communication Squadron, 735 (Winnipeg) Communication Regiment, 736 (Thunder Bay) Communication Squadron, and 737 (Saskatoon) Communication Squadron)
39 Canadian Brigade Group
39 Signal Regiment (formerly 741 (Victoria) Communication Squadron, now B Squadron, 2 Troop; 744 (Vancouver) Communication Regiment, now A Squadron; and 748 (Nanaimo) Communication Squadron, now B Squadron, 1 Troop)
41 Canadian Brigade Group
41 Signal Regiment (formerly 745 (Edmonton) Communication Squadron, 746 (Calgary) Communication Squadron, and 749 (Red Deer) Communication Squadron)

CFS Alert

Staffing at CFS Alert are the responsibility of the Branch. In the past members were drawn by the RCAF or Canadian Army.

Order of precedence

References

Canadian Armed Forces personnel branches
Military communications units and formations
Military units and formations established in 1968